Acanthochitona is a genus of chitons in the family Acanthochitonidae, of worldwide distribution.

Species
According to the World Register of Marine Species (WoRMS), species in the genus Acanthochitona include 

 Acanthochitona achates (Gould, 1859)
 Acanthochitona andersoni Watters, 1981
 Acanthochitona angelica W. H. Dall, 1919
 Acanthochitona approximans (Hedley & Hull, 1912)
 Acanthochitona armata (Pease, 1872)
 Acanthochitona arragonites (Carpenter, 1857)
 Acanthochitona astrigera (Reeve, 1847)
 Acanthochitona avicula (Carpenter, 1857)
 Acanthochitona balesae Pilsbry MS, Abbott, 1954 – slender glass-hair chiton
 Acanthochitona bednalli (Pilsbry, 1894)
 Acanthochitona biformis (Nierstrasz, 1905)
 Acanthochitona bisulcata (Pilsbry, 1893)
 Acanthochitona bouvieri (de Rochebrune, 1881)
 Acanthochitona brookesi Ashby, 1926
 Acanthochitona brunoi Righi, 1971
 Acanthochitona burghardtae Clark, 2000
 Acanthochitona byungdoni Hong, Dell'Angelo & Van Belle, 1990
 Acanthochitona circellata (A. Adams & Reeve MS, Reeve, 1847)
 Acanthochitona ciroi Righi, 1971
 Acanthochitona complanata Hull, 1924
 Acanthochitona coxi (Pilsbry, 1894)
 Acanthochitona crinita (Pennant, 1777)
 Acanthochitona crinita crinita (Pennant, 1777)
 Acanthochitona crinita oblonga Leloup, 1981
 Acanthochitona defilippii (Tapparone Canefri, 1874)
 Acanthochitona discrepans (Brown, 1827)
 Acanthochitona dissimilis Is. & Iw. Taki, 1931
 Acanthochitona exquisita (Pilsbry, 1893)
 Acanthochitona fascicularis (Linnaeus, 1767)
 Acanthochitona ferreirai Lyons, 1988
 Acanthochitona garnoti (de Blainville, 1825)
 Acanthochitona gatliffi Ashby, 1919
 Acanthochitona granostriata (Pilsbry, 1894)
 Acanthochitona hemphilli (Pilsbry, 1893) – red glass-hair chiton
 Acanthochitona hirudiniformis
 Acanthochitona hirudiniformis hirudiniformis (Sowerby in Broderip & Sowerby, 1832)
 Acanthochitona hirudiniformis peruviana Leloup, 1941
 Acanthochitona imperatrix Watters, 1981
 Acanthochitona intermedia(Nierstrasz, 1905)
 Acanthochitona joallesi (de Rochebrune, 1881)
 Acanthochitona jucunda (de Rochebrune, 1882)
 Acanthochitona jugotenuis Kaas, 1979
 Acanthochitona kimberi (Torr, 1912)
 Acanthochitona leopoldi (Leloup, 1933)
 Acanthochitona limbata Kaas, 1986
 Acanthochitona lineata Lyons, 1988
 Acanthochitona macrocystialis Ashby, 1924
 Acanthochitona mahensis Winckworth, 1927
 Acanthochitona mastalleri Leloup MS, Strack, 1989
 Acanthochitona minuta Leloup, 1980
 Acanthochitona noumeaensis Leloup, 1941
 Acanthochitona pelicanensis Mackay, 1929
 Acanthochitona penetrans Winckworth, 1933
 Acanthochitona penicillata (Deshayes, 1863)
 Acanthochitona pilsbryi (Sykes, 1896)
 Acanthochitona pygmaea (Pilsbry, 1893) – striate glass-hair chiton
 Acanthochitona quincunx Leloup, 1981
 Acanthochitona retrojecta (Pilsbry, 1894)
 Acanthochitona rhodea (Pilsbry, 1893)
 Acanthochitona roseojugum Lyons, 1988
 Acanthochitona rubrolineata (Lischke, 1873)
 Acanthochitona saundersi Gowlett & Zeidler, 1987
 Acanthochitona scutigera (A. Adams & Reeve MS, Reeve, 1847)
 Acanthochitona shaskyi Ferreira, 1987
 Acanthochitona shirleyi Ashby, 1922
 Acanthochitona sibogae (Thiele, 1909)
 Acanthochitona subrubicunda Leloup, 1941
 Acanthochitona sueurii (de Blainville, 1825)
 Acanthochitona terezae Guerra Júnior, 1983
 Acanthochitona thackwayi Ashby, 1924
 Acanthochitona thileniusi Lyons, 1988
 Acanthochitona variegata (Nierstrasz, 1906)
 Acanthochitona venezuelana Lyons, 1988
 Acanthochitona viridis (Pease, 1872)
 Acanthochitona woodwardi Kaas & Van Belle, 1988
 Acanthochitona worsfoldi Lyons, 1988
 Acanthochitona zebra Lyons, 1988
 Acanthochitona zelandica (Quoy and Gaimard, 1835)

References

 
 Powell A. W. B., New Zealand Mollusca, William Collins Publishers Ltd, Auckland, New Zealand 1979 

Acanthochitonidae
Extant Oligocene first appearances